
Gmina Krynki is an urban-rural gmina (administrative district) in Sokółka County, Podlaskie Voivodeship, in north-eastern Poland, on the border with Belarus. (Krynki gained town status on 1 January 2009 – prior to that the district was classed as a rural gmina.)

The gmina contains part of the protected area called Knyszyń Forest Landscape Park.

Villages
Apart from the town of Krynki, the gmina contains the villages and settlements of Aleksandrówka, Białogorce, Borsukowizna, Chłodne Włóki, Ciumicze, Górany, Górka, Jamasze, Jurowlany, Kłyszawka, Kruszyniany, Kundzicze, Łapicze, Leszczany, Łosiniany, Nietupa, Nietupa-Kolonia, Nietupskie, Nowa Grzybowszczyzna, Nowa Świdziałówka, Ostrów Południowy, Ozierany Małe, Ozierany Wielkie, Ozierskie, Plebanowo, Podlipki, Podszaciły, Rachowik, Rudaki, Sanniki, Seroczyńszczyzna, Słobódka, Stara Grzybowszczyzna, Studzianka, Szaciły, Trejgle and Żylicze.

Neighbouring gminas
Gmina Krynki is bordered by the gminas of Gródek and Szudziałowo. It also borders Belarus.

References
 Polish official population figures 2006

Krynki
Sokółka County